Rear Admiral Sir Thomas Troubridge, 1st Baronet (22 June 17571 February 1807) was a Royal Navy officer. As a junior officer he saw action at the Battle of Sadras in February 1782 during the American Revolutionary War and the Battle of Trincomalee in September 1782 during the Anglo-French War. He commanded the third-rate Culloden at the Battle of Cape St Vincent in February 1797 during the French Revolutionary Wars. He went on to be First Naval Lord and then served as Commander-in-Chief, East Indies, during the Napoleonic Wars.

Naval career

Born the son of Richard Troubridge, a baker, Troubridge was educated at St Paul's School, London. He entered the Royal Navy on 8 October 1773 and, together with Horatio Nelson, served in the East Indies in the frigate . He was promoted to lieutenant on 1 January 1781 on the newly-purchased sloop Chaser. On 3 March he returned to Seahorse. In her he took part in the Battle of Sadras in February 1782 during the American Revolutionary War and the Battle of Trincomalee in September 1782 during the Anglo-French War. His first command was the sloop  in October 1782.

Promoted to post-captain on 1 January 1783, Troubridge was given command of the frigate  and was present at the Siege of Cuddalore in June 1783. After that he transferred to the third-rate . He was appointed to the frigate  in 1790.

Appointed to command the frigate  in May 1794, he and his ship were captured by the French while escorting a convoy, but he was liberated soon afterwards. On his return he was appointed to command , a third-rate ship of the line, in which he fought at the Battle of the Hyères Islands, led an unsuccessful pursuit of a French squadron in the Aegean Sea, and led the line at the Battle of Cape St Vincent, being commended for his courage and initiative by Admiral Sir John Jervis.

In July 1797 he assisted Nelson in the unsuccessful attack on Santa Cruz de Tenerife. In August 1798, when getting into position for the attack on the French fleet, Culloden ran aground on a shoal near the entrance to Aboukir Bay and was consequently unable to take any part in the Battle of the Nile. At Nelson's request, however, he was awarded the gold medal commemorating the victory.

Troubridge then served in the Mediterranean and was created a baronet on 30 November 1799. In February 1801 he joined the Board of Admiralty as First Naval Lord.

On his arrival the area of command was changed to that of the Cape Station. He left Madras in January 1807 for the Cape of Good Hope. Off the coast of Madagascar, Blenheim, an old and damaged ship, foundered in a cyclone and the admiral and all others on board perished.

Arms

References

Sources

Further reading

External links
Kidd, Charles, Williamson, David (editors). Debrett's Peerage and Baronetage (1990 edition). New York: St Martin's Press, 1990.

|-

|-

1757 births
1807 deaths
Baronets in the Baronetage of Great Britain
Royal Navy personnel of the French Revolutionary Wars
Deaths due to shipwreck at sea
Deaths in tropical cyclones
Lords of the Admiralty
Members of the Parliament of the United Kingdom for English constituencies
People educated at St Paul's School, London
Royal Navy rear admirals
UK MPs 1802–1806
Politics of the Borough of Great Yarmouth